PHASE is a partnership between several international non-governmental organisations (NGOs) registered in Austria, Nepal, the United Kingdom (UK) and the United States of America (USA). The organisations specialise in improving health and education services and livelihood opportunities for disadvantaged populations and most of this work takes place in Nepal. The acronym, PHASE, stands for "Practical Help Achieving Self Empowerment" and describes the working ethic of the organisations.

History
PHASE was founded in 2005 by a group of friends, united by an interest in working in Nepal. PHASE later established several partnerships and now operates as PHASE Austria, PHASE Nepal, Nepal Teacher Training Innovations (NTTI) and PHASE Worldwide.

PHASE Nepal's work in Nepal
PHASE Nepal implements community based projects in remote communities in Nepal. The organisation aims to help the most vulnerable in Nepalese villages to make their way out of poverty. PHASE Nepal works with communities and local authorities to build the foundations for a future that does not rely on outside sources of funding. PHASE Nepal has its headquarters in Dadhikot just south of the Araniko Highway between Kathmandu and Bhaktapur, Nepal. During 2017 they received support from and are working with Medecins du Monde on new health promotion work.

Activities
PHASE works with remote Himalayan communities aiming to reduce poverty by improving health, education and improving livelihood opportunities.
 The charity supports primary care in areas that have little or no existing services. They support the Nepali governmental health centres with improved buildings, equipment, medicines and qualified staff. In its first nine years of existence, its health workers saw around 140,000 patients, delivered over 400 babies and built 480 toilets.
In 2009, PHASE Nepal received a grant from the British Medical Association (BMA) Humanitarian Fund enabling it to publish clinical treatment guidelines for health workers in Nepal. In 2014 PHASE Nepal had over 40 health workers supporting health posts in 13 communities. In 2016/17, over 100,000 people were seen at PHASE supported health centres.
 PHASE Nepal aims to raise levels of literacy and numeracy to give children and adults more opportunities and choices. PHASE Nepal supports government schools with teaching materials, buildings, salaries for extra teachers, early childhood development programmes and scholarships. Since 2006 PHASE Nepal has supplied 10 schools with safe drinking water and toilets, upgraded 1 school to secondary level so children can pass their School Leaving Exams in their home community, helped 60 children complete a catch-up curriculum and integrate into mainstream school, and enabled 200 women to complete adult literacy classes.
 PHASE Nepal aims to improve income generation opportunities. Between 2006 and 2011 the organisation promoted better fertilising techniques to increase yields and introduced cash crops like vegetables, garlic and spices. PHASE Nepal also runs animal husbandry programmes so families have livestock to sell.

PHASE Partners

PHASE Austria
PHASE Austria raises funds for various aspects of PHASE Nepal’s work, with an initial focus on the field of education, but more recently also in healthcare and livelihoods. Since 2011, PHASE Austria has secured grants for its work from the City of Vienna, NAK Humanitas and the Austrian Ministry of Sports. Following the devastating 2015 earthquakes, PHASE Austria also contributed important funds for PHASE's efforts in disaster relief and reconstruction. In 2017, PHASE Austria was awarded the Else Kröner-Fresenius Preis für medizinische Entwicklungszusammenarbeit, a prestigious award in medical development cooperation, for the PHASE integrated programme for the improvement of healthcare for mothers and children in Mugu, Western Nepal.

PHASE Worldwide
PHASE Worldwide raises funds and provides technical expertise to PHASE Nepal. The headquarters are in Bristol, UK. A board of trustees oversees the organisation to ensure that its core values and purpose are reflected in the way it operates. PHASE Worldwide received funding in 2014 from the United Kingdom Department for International Development (DFID) and was still being funded by them in 2017. It is registered with the UK Charity Commission.

Activities
 PHASE Worldwide raises funds from regular donors, events, supporter events and fundraisers, selling Nepalese made goods, competing in campaigns organised through GlobalGiving and receiving grants and trusts from organisations such as The BMA Humanitarian Fund, The British Society of Colposcopy and Cervical Pathology, The Funding Network (TFN), Lions and others.
 PHASE Worldwide has designed education programmes aimed at integrating global citizenship across the primary curriculum and developing the enterprise skills of adolescents in the UK.
 PHASElets is the junior (under 16) committee of PHASE Worldwide. Their aim is to raise awareness and funds for the projects in which PHASE is involved.

Partnership working
PHASE works in partnership with individual volunteers and organisations to improve the delivery of programmes. Partnerships include the Child Welfare Scheme, volunteering programmes for NHS health professionals, links with the University of Sheffield and St George's, University of London that allow students to experience Nepal as part of their education, partnerships with several hospitals, general practices in the UK which support work in Nepal, and a partnership with Hewlett-Packard who provided a team of PHASE health workers with notebook computers for their health posts and a notebook for electronic storage in the Nepal headquarters.

Patrons and ambassadors 
Brian Blessed, a film and stage actor, was born and grew up in Rotherham, where PHASE was established. He is a patron of PHASE Worldwide. Rosie Swale-Pope is an adventurer, author and marathon runner from Switzerland. In 2003, she ran the 1,7000 kilometres across Nepal and set a new world record as she completed it within 68 days which raised funds for a PHASE health camp in Humla, Nepal. She is a patron of PHASE Worldwide.

Alex Staniforth became an ambassador for PHASE in 2016. Staniforth has twice attempted to conquer Everest but was prevented from doing so by the 2015 Nepal earthquake. In the aftermath of the disaster, Alex worked with PHASE to raise over £15,000 for the disaster relief fund and helped to organise the 'Walk for Nepal' event on the anniversary of the earthquake in 2016. He has raised over £50,000 in total for Nepal. In autumn 2016, Alex attempted to climb Cho Oyu, the world's sixth highest mountain as a PHASE ambassador.

References

Economic development organizations
Foreign charities operating in Nepal
Health charities in the United Kingdom
International medical and health organizations
Organizations established in 2005
International volunteer organizations